Kelvedon railway station is on the Great Eastern Main Line (GEML) in the East of England, serving the villages of Kelvedon and Feering, Essex. It is also the closest station to the settlements of Coggeshall and Tiptree. Kelvedon is  down the line from London Liverpool Street. Its three-letter station code is KEL.

The station was opened in 1843 by the Eastern Counties Railway. It is currently operated by Greater Anglia, who also operate all trains serving it, as part of the East Anglia franchise.

To the north-east was a separate station called Kelvedon Low Level, which until 1951 was the terminus of the now disused Kelvedon and Tollesbury Light Railway.

History

In common with most rural stations, Kelvedon handled local goods and a 1923 plan shows sidings with cattle pens on the up-side at the London end, and sidings with a goods shed on the down-side at the London end of the station. There was also a large warehouse which was used by King Seeds for many years on the down-side. The goods yard closed on 7 December 1964.

There was a link line to Kelvedon Low Level railway station with a drop of 1 in 50, which joined the main line at the country end of the up line.

The station complex was controlled by a signal box at the London end of the up platform which closed on 3 December 1961 when Witham power box became responsible for the section through to Marks Tey.

Accidents and incidents
On 17 October 1872, one passenger was killed and 16 people were injured in a derailment at Kelvedon. The 09:45 express service from Yarmouth to  left the tracks as it approached Kelvedon at a speed of up to 40 mph. A Board of Trade investigation blamed a suspension defect through lack of maintenance.
The team had taken refuge in a place of safety as the train passed, but one of them was injured by a steel threaded plug which flew off the moving locomotive, which was travelling at speed. The worker suffered a fracture to his skull and injury to his hand.

Services
The following services typically call at Kelvedon:

References

External links

Railway stations in Essex
DfT Category C2 stations
Former Great Eastern Railway stations
Railway stations in Great Britain opened in 1843
Greater Anglia franchise railway stations
1843 establishments in England